This page details the match results and statistics of the Brazil olympic football team during the age restriction (U-23) era.

1990s

2000

2010

2020

Record by opponent

References

Olympic
Brazil national under-23 football team